France men's national inline hockey team is the national team for France. The team finished champion at the 2017 FIRS World Inline Hockey Championships – Senior Men's tournament.

References 

National inline hockey teams
Inline hockey
Inline hockey in France